Intel 2700G (code-named Marathon) is a low power (50 mW max) graphics co-processor for the XScale PXA27x processor, announced on April 12, 2004. It is built on both the PowerVR MBX Lite chip design (which is a descendant from the PowerVR2 graphics technology that powered SEGA Dreamcast) and on the MVED1 video encoder/decoder technology.

Different variants

This accelerator comes in 3 variants: The 2700G3, 2700G5 and 2700G7.

2700G3
The 2700G3 is the value version of the accelerator. It has 384 kB of on-die memory suitable for driving an HVGA (320×480) or smaller graphics display.

2700G5
The 2700G5 is the performance version of the accelerator. It has 704 kB of on-die memory suitable for driving a VGA (640×480) resolution display and decoding MPEG-4 video.

2700G7
The 2700G7 is the same as the 2700G5 but is stacked with 16 MB of local memory with a 100 MHz, 32-bit bus (maximum 400 MB/s theoretical bandwidth) in the same package.

Features

All the chips have a 75 MHz, 32-bit core shipped in BGA packaging.

Accelerated dual display
The 2700G has its own LCD controller and two LCD outputs. This allows for the XScale processor and 2700G's graphics displays to be used at the same time. The 2700G can drive an external display up to 1024×768 (with 32-bit colour) or 1280×1024 (with 16-bit colour).

2D graphics acceleration
The accelerator supports clipping, alpha blending and anti-aliasing. It also has a variety of block level transfer (BLT) functions. The 2D accelerator is capable of up to an 84 million pixels per second fill rate (150 million pixels per second claimed by intel).

2D features of Intel 2700G 
 ROP 2,3,4
 Alpha Blending
 Full-screen antialiasing
 BitBLT, StretchBLT, CSCBLT
 Hardware doubling and multiplication of pixels
 Color depth of 16, 18, and 24 bit

3D graphics acceleration
The 2700G has a complete hardware rendering pipeline and is compatible with the OpenGL ES 1.0 standard, using the common-lite profile. The 3D accelerator is capable of processing about 831 000 triangles per second (944,000 triangles per second claimed by intel).

3D features of Intel 2700G 
 Screen tiling
 Texture compression
 Flat shading and gourad shading
 Perspective correct texturing
 Vertex fogging
 Pixel Alpha Blending
 Bilinear, trilinear, and anisotropic filtering
 Dot3 Bump Mapping.
 Full-screen AA (supersampling)
 Z-buffer 
 Internal ARGB rendering
 Hardware converter of integer values into floating point

Video acceleration
The 2700G performs Inverse Zig-Zag, Inverse Discrete Cosine Transform, and Motion Compensation to speed up MPEG-1, MPEG-2, MPEG-4 and WMV video decoding. The accelerator can decode MPEG-1, MPEG-2 and WMV at 720×576 (DVD Resolution), MPEG-4 at 640×480, and H.264/AVC baseline at 352x288, all at 30 frames per second.

Devices
The 2700G was featured in the Dell Axim X50v, Dell Axim X51v, Gigabyte GSmart t600, Pepper Pad 2 and Palm Foleo (cancelled).
It was also used in some standalone signage kiosks such as the MediaStaff DS and HID's, such as the Clipsal DALIcontrol DCLCD70 LCD Touch Screen Controller, and the Advantech UbiQ-350 and UbiQ-470.

As of Intel selling its XScale unit to Marvell, this device is discontinued.

See also
 XScale processor
 Imageon - ATI
 Adreno -  Developed by Qualcomm
 GoForce - Competing mobile graphics processors
 PowerVR
 ARM Mali

References

External links
 Pepper Pad
 3D accelerated games designed for use with the 2700g.

Intel graphics
Intel microprocessors
Graphics cards